South Carolina Highway 203 (SC 203) is a  state highway in the U.S. state of South Carolina. The highway connects Abbeville and rural areas of Abbeville County.

Route description
SC 203 begins at an intersection with SC 20 (North Main Street) on the northeastern corner of the central square in Abbeville, Abbeville County, where the roadway continues as Trinity Street. It travels to the northeast and immediately curves to the north-northeast before crossing over Parker Creek. It passes Abbeville High School just before leaving the city limits. The highway crosses over McCord Creek, Morrison Branch, Bailey Creek, and Job Creek before meeting its northern terminus, an intersection with SC 185 (Old Douglas Mill Road).

Major intersections

Abbeville truck route

South Carolina Highway 203 Truck (SC 203 Truck) is a  truck route that is completely within the southeastern part of Abbeville and in the southeastern part of Abbeville County. Except for one sign near its southern terminus, it is only signed as "Truck Route".

The truck route begins at an intersection with SC 72 (Greenwood Street), where the roadway continues as a portion of South Main Street. This intersection is also the southern terminus of SC 20 Truck and SC 71 Truck, which follow SC 72 to the south. SC 203 Truck travels to the northwest on South Main Street. Immediately, it turns right onto Penny Street and heads to the north-northeast. At the end of Penny Street, it turns left onto Poplar Street and resumes its northwestern routing. At Branch Street, it turns right and travels to the northeast. Just past the northern terminus of Secession Street, it turns left onto Chestnut Street. The highway curves to the northwest. At the next intersection, it reaches its northern terminus, the SC 203 mainline (Washington Street). Here, Chestnut Street continues to the northwest.

See also

References

External links

SC 203 South Carolina Hwy Index

203
Transportation in Abbeville County, South Carolina